Hinterland is the second studio album by British musician Aim, released on 26 February 2002 by Grand Central Records.

The album spent one week on the UK Albums Chart at number 47.

Track listing

Personnel
Credits for Hinterland adapted from album liner notes.

 Aim – arrangement, production, design

Additional musicians
 Chris Cruiks – drums
 Diamond D – performance
 Stephen Jones – performance, recorder
 Kate Rogers – performance
 Sneaky – bass, cello
 Souls of Mischief – performance
 Phil Turner – bass, guitar
 Danny Ward – drums
 Roger Wickham – bandurria, flute

Production
 Steve Christian – recording
 Martin Desai – engineering, recording
 Nilesh Patel – mastering

Design
 Gripper – design
 Nick Fry – design

Management
 Darren Laws – A&R
 Mark Rae – A&R

Charts

References

2002 albums
Aim (musician) albums
Grand Central Records albums